Sar Asiab (also Romanized as Sar Āsīāb and Sarāseyāb) is a village in Shandiz Rural District, Shandiz District, Torqabeh and Shandiz County, Razavi Khorasan Province, Iran. At the 2006 census, its population was 1,453, in 374 families.

References 

Populated places in Torqabeh and Shandiz County